Daniel Rosenfeldt (born March 23, 1989) is a South African guitarist and magician based in Copenhagen, Denmark. In 2009, he graduated from the Liverpool Institute for Performing Arts (LIPA), a music school founded by Paul McCartney, and is recognised for his fingerstyle guitar and sleight-of-hand magic.

Rosenfeldt is known for performing at the 2014 Skanderborg Festival, touring in Det Stribede Show with Rune Klan, and playing in the Louisiana Museum of Modern Art. He was also a semi-finalist in the 2018 Danmark Har Talent and also performed in the Elements tour with The Copenhagen Drummers.

Biography
Rosenfeldt was born in southern Transvaal (now Gauteng), South Africa and grew up on a farm in White River, eastern Transvaal (now Mpumalanga). At age 18, he moved to Verbier, Switzerland to pursue a professional career working as a private entertainer. At 19 he moved to Liverpool, England to study at the Liverpool Institute for Performing Arts (LIPA), a music school founded by Paul McCartney. After graduation he moved to Copenhagen, Denmark and has been working privately as a solo guitarist and touring as a supporting act for Rune Klan.

Discography
Daniel Rosenfeldt - EP - released independently in 2012 through Grabowski Productions.

Format: CD, EP
Country: Denmark
Released: 15 October 2012
Genre: Pop, Folk, World, & Country
Style: Acoustic
 Tracklist:
1. Leaving Liverpool
2. Good Morning Copenhagen
3. A Christmas In South Africa
4. Le Pain Au Chocolat
5. Spring In South Carolina

Over the Moon - EP - released independently in 2018 
Format: CD, EP
Country: Denmark
Released: 22 October 2018
Genre: Pop, Folk, World, & Country
Style: Acoustic
 Tracklist:
1. Someone Somewhere Something 
2. Over the Moon 
3. Norway in No Time 
4. Heading North 
5. Guitarzan

References

1989 births
Living people